Murat Ramonov (born July 21, 1990) is a Kyrgyzstani Greco-Roman wrestler. He competed in the men's Greco-Roman 130 kg event at the 2016 Summer Olympics, in which he was eliminated in the round of 32 by Sergey Semenov.

Major results

References

External links
 

1990 births
Living people
Kyrgyzstani male sport wrestlers
Olympic wrestlers of Kyrgyzstan
Wrestlers at the 2016 Summer Olympics
Wrestlers at the 2010 Asian Games
Wrestlers at the 2014 Asian Games
Wrestlers at the 2018 Asian Games
Asian Games competitors for Kyrgyzstan
Asian Wrestling Championships medalists
21st-century Kyrgyzstani people